Guillermo Larco Cox (February 19, 1932 – July 12, 2002), is a civil engineer and Peruvian politician. Member of the Peruvian Aprista Party, achieved the position of Senator and Prime Minister.

Early life and career 
Guillermo Larco Cox was born in Trujillo on February 19, 1932. Son of Victor Larco and Alicia Cox; his siblings were Carolina, Alicia, and Victor Larco Cox. He married Laura Manucci, with whom he had 6 children (Mariana, Laura, Javier, Ricardo (†2011), Guillermo (†2005) and Alicia).

In 1961, was elected President of the 1st Directive Board of the Firemen department of Trujillo.

Political career 
He joined the Peruvian Aprista Party in his youth, which led him to become the first democratically elected Mayor of Trujillo in 1963, serving until 1969. From 1980 to 1985 he was elected to the Chamber of Deputies for the Department of La Libertad, and then as a Senator for the term 1985-1990. Elected for the Vice-Presidency of the Senate for the term 1986-1987.

During his term in the Senate, he also had the chance to serve under Alan García's first term as Head of the Cabinet, (from June 27, 1987 to May 13, 1988 and from September 30, 1989 to July 28, 1990). Among other positions, Larco was appointed as Minister of the Presidency and as Minister of Foreign Relations.

After Alan García's first term ended, Larco briefly retired from politics until the 2000, when he ran for a seat in Congress under the APRA party, but was not elected because he received a minority of votes and subsequently retired from politics until his death on July 12, 2002 in his house in the Limean district of San Isidro.

Honours
 The Order of the Sun

See also 
 Alan García

1932 births
2002 deaths
20th-century Peruvian engineers
Peruvian people of British descent
American Popular Revolutionary Alliance politicians
Members of the Chamber of Deputies of Peru
Members of the Senate of Peru
Prime Ministers of Peru
Foreign ministers of Peru
Mayors of Trujillo, Peru
Peruvian civil engineers